David White (born 22 May 1991) is a South African cricketer who played for the Warriors cricket team. In early 2021, White moved to San Francisco with the aim of playing cricket in the United States. In June 2021, White was selected in the players' draft ahead of the Minor League Cricket tournament.

References

External links
 

1991 births
Living people
South African cricketers
Eastern Province cricketers
Warriors cricketers
Cricketers from Durban